Bartercard Private LTD. is an operator of a barter trading exchange. Bartercard enables businesses to exchange goods and services without the use of cash or cash equivalents, or without a direct swap. Bartercard is a trading platform which enables businesses to exchange goods and services with others. These transactions are recorded electronically, with ‘Trade Dollars’ substituted for New Zealand currency. Each trade dollar is equivalent to one Australian / American dollar.

Founding 
Bartercard was founded on the Gold Coast, Australia in 1991 by Wayne Sharpe, Brian Hall and Andrew Federowsky. Bartercard has a presence in eight countries (Australia, New Zealand, South Africa, United Kingdom, United States, Thailand, United Arab Emirates and Cyprus) where 75 offices service approximately 34,000 cardholders worldwide who collectively barter-trade over $600m each year.  In 2007, Bartercard Australia was sold in a management buyout.

Description
Members earn Bartercard Trade Dollars / Pounds for the goods and services they sell and this value is recorded electronically in the member’s account database, or goes towards repaying the credit that the member may have used.

For calculating taxation liability, the Australian Taxation Office (ATO) treats one Bartercard Trade Dollar the same way that it treats one Australian Dollar.

Evaluation

Bartercard is not based on barter but on local currency. The trade is limited
and mainly serves to attract new customers, increase sales, and offer networking opportunities

References

External links 
 Bartercard

Service companies of Australia
Payment systems
1991 establishments in Australia